Hans Nordin may refer to
 Hans Nordin (curler) (born 1959), Swedish curler
 Hans Nordin (fisherman) (born 1952), Swedish fishing guide, TV host and author
 Hans Nordin (ski jumper) (born 1931), Swedish ski jumper